Daybreak is a studio album released by jazz pianist Dave Burrell. It was recorded in 1989 and released that same year by Gazell records. The album mainly Burrell in duet with long-time jazz collaborator David Murray on reed instruments.

Track listing
"Daybreak" (Burrell) — 12:03
"Sketch #1" (Murray) — 9:54
"Blue Hour" (Burrell) — 13:45
"Qasbah Rendezvous" (Burrell) — 8:21

Personnel 
Dave Burrell — piano
David Murray  — clarinet (bass), saxophone (tenor)

Production:
Glenn Barratt — engineer
Samuel Charters — producer, liner notes, photography

Reception 

Allmusic says that Burrell and Murray are "overtly experimental ... that doesn't play to the strengths of these musicians." Reviewer Brian Olewnick suggests listeners hear the quartet the two were a part of with Fred Hopkins and Andrew Cyrille around the same time this album was released in order to "better hear their capabilities."

References

External links 
 

1989 albums
Post-bop albums
Free jazz albums
Bebop albums
Avant-garde jazz albums
Gazell Records albums
Dave Burrell albums
Instrumental duet albums